The Central District of Zirkuh County is a district (bakhsh) in Zirkuh County, South Khorasan Province, Iran. At the 2006 census, its population was 26,203, in 6,189 families.  The District has two cities: Hajjiabad and Zohan. The District has three rural districts (dehestan): Petergan Rural District, Shaskuh Rural District, and Zirkuh Rural District.

See also 
 Petregan playa

References 

Districts of South Khorasan Province
Zirkuh County